Leoparda (4th century, Byzantium) was a gynecologist who served in the Court of Gratian (359–383).

Information about Leoparda comes from a book by Emperor Gratian’s physician Theodorus Priscianus that he wrote for the purpose of educating women doctors.  In the book he notes that Leoparda was a respected gynecologist, but that her remedies were no more scientific than those of the Greek Dioscorides.  The book contained quotations from Soranus, Cleopatria, and Aspasia. He dedicated the book to Leoparda and two other women physicians, Salvina and Victoria.

Sources
 Priscian Theodorus. Ad Timotheum fratrem. Book 3: Gynaeccea ad Slavinam. Basel: In Officina Frobeniana, 1532. Book 3 discusses Leoparda.

References

4th-century Byzantine physicians
4th-century Byzantine women
Ancient gynaecologists
Ancient Greek women physicians
Byzantine women physicians